The Jefferson County Courthouse is located at 301 Market Street in Steubenville, Ohio.  It is the original courthouse constructed for Jefferson County.  It was constructed in 1871 through 1874 by Heard & Blythe architectural firm.

Exterior
The courthouse was originally designed and built with four floors, high arched windows with hood-moulds and keystones, sectional Corinthian columns, and a flight of stairs to each entrance.  Above the entrances are high Corinthian columns supporting a pediment.  The main entrance has Justice standing on the peak of the pediment.  The mansard roof contained dormer windows with a central tower capped with a mansard roof.

The sandstone building is severely discolored due to the polluted air from the surrounding steel factories and heavy traffic.  In 1950 during a ferocious snowstorm, the top floor collapsed, destroying the ornate roof and tower.  Instead of reconstructing the mansard roof and tower, the county officials decided to keep the roof flat.

Grounds
The courthouse stands diagonal from the site of Fort Steuben. A plaque to the left of the main entrance is in memoriam to the USS Maine (ACR-1) and is made from metal recovered from the ship. In front of the courthouse is a statue of Stuebenville native Edwin McMasters Stanton, United States Secretary of War to President Abraham Lincoln.

Further reading
County Courthouses of Ohio by Susan W. Thrane

References

External links
Official Website
Courthouse: A Grand Structure
Original design

Buildings and structures in Jefferson County, Ohio
County courthouses in Ohio